The 2015–16 Northern Illinois Huskies women's basketball team represented Northern Illinois University during the 2015–16 NCAA Division I women's basketball season. The Huskies, led by first year head coach Lisa Carlsen, played their home games at the Convocation Center as members of the West Division of the Mid-American Conference. They finished the season 11–19, 4–14 in MAC play and finished last place in the West division.

Roster

Schedule
Source: 

|-
!colspan=9 style="background:#000000; color:#C41E3A;"| Exhibition

|-
!colspan=9 style="background:#000000; color:#C41E3A;"| Non-conference regular season

|-
!colspan=9 style="background:#000000; color:#C41E3A;"| MAC regular season

|-
!colspan=9 style="background:#000000; color:#C41E3A;" | MAC Women's Tournament

See also
 2015–16 Northern Illinois Huskies men's basketball team

References
2015–16 Women's Basketball Prospectus

Northern Illinois
Northern Illinois Huskies women's basketball seasons